Svetlana Tširkova  (from 1980, Tširkova-Lozovaja)  (born November 5, 1945, Tupner, Tsivilsky District, Chuvash ASSR, Soviet Union) is a former Soviet fencer, two-time Olympic champion in foil team competitions and fencing coach in Estonia.

She received two gold medals in team foil at the Summer Olympics from 1968 and 1972 games.

In the 1969 individual competition at the World Championships in Havana, Cuba, she lost only to Romanian  Ileana Gyulai-Drîmbă-Jenei and won bronze medal.

She was awarded with Medal "For Distinguished Labour", classified as a Merited Master of Sport of the USSR in 1972.

Living in Estonia since 1950, she graduated from the Pedagogical University of Tallinn in 1973 and was also 5 time fencing champion of the Estonian SSR.

As an olympic winner, she is honorary member of the Estonian Olympic Committee.

She is a mother of two sons, Eduard "Edik" Ber and Kirill Lozovoi, who are also fencers.

In 2006 she received the Estonian Order of the White Star (Third Class) and in 2016 .

References

1945 births
Living people
Soviet female foil fencers
Estonian female foil fencers
Olympic fencers of the Soviet Union
Fencers at the 1968 Summer Olympics
Fencers at the 1972 Summer Olympics
Olympic gold medalists for the Soviet Union
Olympic medalists in fencing
Medalists at the 1968 Summer Olympics
Medalists at the 1972 Summer Olympics
Tallinn University alumni
Estonian people of Russian descent
Recipients of the Order of the White Star, 3rd Class